Eureka is the second studio album by German recording artist Leslie Clio. It was released by Vertigo Berlin on 17 April 2015 in German-speaking Europe.

Track listing
Credits adapted from the liner notes of Eureka.

Notes
 denotes co-producer.

Charts

Weekly charts

References

External links 
 Official website

2015 albums
Leslie Clio albums
Albums produced by Dimitri Tikovoi